The Final Frontier is a 1986 album by the American glam metal band Keel. It was the band's second album to be produced by KISS bassist Gene Simmons. Videos were filmed for the tracks "Because the Night" (a Patti Smith Group cover) and "Tears of Fire".

Track listing
Side one
 "The Final Frontier" (Ron Keel, Greg Chaisson) - 3.20
 "Rock and Roll Animal" (Marc Ferrari) - 4.47
 "Because the Night" (Bruce Springsteen, Patti Smith) - 3.47
 "Here Today, Gone Tomorrow" (R. Keel) - 4.06 
 "Arm and a Leg" (R. Keel, Ferrari, Bryan Jay, Chaisson) - 3.08

Side two
"Raised on Rock" (Ferrari) - 3.10
 "Just Another Girl" (R. Keel) - 3.16
 "Tears of Fire" (Ferrari) - 4.20
 "Nightfall" (Ferrari) - 1.56
 "No Pain No Gain" (R. Keel) - 3.44

Personnel
Band members
Ron Keel – vocals, guitars, keyboards
Marc Ferrari – guitars, backing vocals
Bryan Jay – guitars, backing vocals
Kenny Chaisson – bass, backing vocals
Dwain Miller – drums, backing vocals

Guest musicians
Michael Des Barres - vocals on "Raised on Rock"
Joan Jett - rhythm guitar on "Raised on Rock"
Jaime St. James - backing vocals on "Rock and Roll Animal"
Gregg Giuffria - backing vocals on "No Pain No Gain"
Mitch Perry - rhythm guitar on "Tears of Fire"

Production
Gene Simmons - producer
Dave Wittman - engineer, mixing
Bruce Buchhalter, Tom Nist, Kevin Smith - assistant engineers
George Marino - mastering at Sterling Sound, New York
John Taylor Dismukes - art direction
Neil Zlozower - photography

References

Keel (band) albums
1986 albums
MCA Records albums
Albums produced by Gene Simmons
Albums recorded at Electric Lady Studios
Vertigo Records albums